Avi Gil (born January 11, 1955) is a former Israeli diplomat who served as director general of The Israel Ministry of Foreign Affairs. Since 2003 he as a Senior Fellow at the Jewish People Policy Institute (JPPI).

Biography
Gil served as director general of The Israel Ministry of Foreign Affairs (2001–2002), the Prime Minister's Chief of Staff (1995–1996), Director-General of the Ministry of Regional Cooperation (1999-2001) (He).

Gil has been closely involved in Israel's policy-making and peace efforts, including the negotiations that led to the Oslo Accords. His book: "Shimon Peres, An Insider’s Account of the Man and the Struggle for a New Middle East" has been published by I.B. Tauris (November 2020).

Gil served as Director of Content of the five Israeli Presidential Conferences “Facing Tomorrow” (2009-2014). He has also been the content director of the Global Forum of the National Library of Israel since its inception in 2014.

Gil holds master degrees from The Hebrew University of Jerusalem (Political Science) and from Harvard Kennedy School (Public Administration).

Publications
Avi Gil, Shimon Peres: an insider's account of the man and the struggle for a New Middle East, London: I.B. Tauris, 2020

Selected articles
Will Biden save the two-state solution? Al-Monitor, 26 Novembre 2020
 Trump’s defeat ends the Israeli right’s long celebration, The Times of Israel, November 10, 2020
 No substitute for Oslo and the ‘new Middle East’, The Jerusalem Post, October 28, 2020
 The Geopolitical Arena in the Shadow of the COVID-19 Pandemic, JPPI, September 2, 2020
 The Evolving World Order: Implications for Israel and the Jewish People, JPPI, April 16, 2019
 Will Netanyahu Surrender to the Annexation Camp? Haaretz, February 16, 2018
 How Americans Enable Israel's 'Jewish or Democratic State' Delusion, Forward, February 7, 2016
 The downside of Blinken’s encouraging confirmation hearing, Jerusalem Post, January 25, 2021
 President Biden, restoring world order and its impact on Israel, Jerusalem Post, February 16, 2021
 To escape endless elections, Israel needs a new generation of ‘naïve’ leaders, The Forward, March 8, 2021

References

External links
 Avi Gil at the Israel Ministry of Foreign Affairs site

Israeli diplomats
1955 births
Living people
Hebrew University of Jerusalem Faculty of Social Sciences alumni
Harvard Kennedy School alumni